The Dadda multiplier is a hardware binary multiplier design invented by computer scientist Luigi Dadda in 1965. It uses a selection of full and half adders to sum the partial products in stages (the Dadda tree or Dadda reduction) until two numbers are left. The design is similar to the Wallace multiplier, but the different reduction tree reduces the required number of gates (for all but the smallest operand sizes) and makes it slightly faster (for all operand sizes). 

 Reduce the number of partial products by stages of full and half adders until we are left with at most two bits of each weight.
 Add the final result with a conventional adder.

As with the Wallace multiplier, the multiplication products of the first step carry different weights reflecting the magnitude of the original bit values in the multiplication. For example, the product of bits  has weight .

Unlike Wallace multipliers that reduce as much as possible on each layer, Dadda multipliers attempt to minimize the number of gates used, as well as input/output delay. Because of this, Dadda multipliers have a less expensive reduction phase, but the final numbers may be a few bits longer, thus requiring slightly bigger adders.

Description 
To achieve a more optimal final product, the structure of the reduction process is governed by slightly more complex rules than in Wallace multipliers. 

The progression of the reduction is controlled by a maximum-height sequence , defined by:

 

This yields a sequence like so:

 

The lesser of the two bit lengths will be the maximum height of each column of weights after the first stage of multiplication.

 If  the column does not require reduction, move to column 
 If  add the top two elements in a half-adder, placing the result at the bottom of the column and the carry at the bottom of column , then move to column 
 Else, add the top three elements in a full-adder, placing the result at the bottom of the column and the carry at the bottom of column , restart at step 1

Algorithm example 

The example in the adjacent image illustrates the reduction of an 8 × 8 multiplier, explained here.

Stage , 
  are all less than or equal to six bits in height, so no changes are made
 , so a half-adder is applied, reducing it to six bits and adding its carry bit to 
  are all less than or equal to six bits in height including carry bits, so no changes are made
Stage , 
  are all less than or equal to four bits in height, so no changes are made
 , so a half-adder is applied, reducing it to four bits and adding its carry bit to 
  including previous carry bits, so we apply two full-adders to reduce them to four bits
  including previous carry bits, so we apply a full-adder to reduce it to four bits
  are all less than or equal to four bits in height including carry bits, so no changes are made
Stage , 
  are all less than or equal to three bits in height, so no changes are made
 , so a half-adder is applied, reducing it to three bits and adding its carry bit to 
  including previous carry bits, so we apply one full-adder to reduce them to three bits
  are all less than or equal to three bits in height including carry bits, so no changes are made
Stage , 
  are all less than or equal to two bits in height, so no changes are made
 , so a half-adder is applied, reducing it to two bits and adding its carry bit to 
  including previous carry bits, so we apply one full-adder to reduce them to two bits
Addition

The output of the last stage leaves 15 columns of height two or less which can be passed into a standard adder.

See also
 Booth's multiplication algorithm
 Fused multiply–add
 Wallace tree
 BKM algorithm for complex logarithms and exponentials
 Kochanski multiplication for modular multiplication

References

Further reading
 

Arithmetic logic circuits

Computer arithmetic
Multiplication
1965 introductions
1965 in computing